The eighth season of Blue Bloods, a police procedural drama series created by Robin Green and Mitchell Burgess, premiered on CBS September 29, 2017. The season contained 22 episodes and concluded on May 11, 2018.

Cast
Donnie Wahlberg (Danny Reagan), Bridget Moynahan (Erin Reagan), Will Estes (Jamie Reagan), and Len Cariou (Henry Reagan) are first credited. Sami Gayle (Nicky Reagan-Boyle) is credited next, marking the fourth season she has been included in the opening credits. Tom Selleck (Frank Reagan) receives an "and" billing at the close of the main title sequence. Amy Carlson (Linda Reagan) left between Seasons 7 and 8.

Marisa Ramirez, as Danny's partner Detective Maria Baez, and Vanessa Ray, as Jamie's partner Eddie Janko, continue to receive "also starring" billing for season 8. Appearing regularly and receiving "special guest star" billing are Gregory Jbara as Deputy Commissioner of Public Information Garrett Moore, Robert Clohessy as Lt. Sidney Gormley, and Abigail Hawk as Detective Abigail Baker, Frank's primary aide.

Main cast 
Tom Selleck as NYPD Police Commissioner Francis "Frank" Reagan
Donnie Wahlberg as Detective 1st Grade Daniel "Danny" Reagan
Bridget Moynahan as ADA Erin Reagan
Will Estes as Officer Jamison "Jamie" Reagan
Len Cariou as Henry Reagan
Sami Gayle as Nicole "Nicky" Reagan-Boyle
Marisa Ramirez as Detective 1st Grade Maria Baez 
Vanessa Ray as Officer Edit "Eddie" Janko

Recurring cast 
Abigail Hawk as Detective 1st Grade Abigail Baker
Gregory Jbara as Deputy Commissioner of Public Information Garrett Moore
Robert Clohessy as Lieutenant Sidney "Sid" Gormley
Steve Schirripa as DA Investigator Anthony Abetemarco
Peter Hermann as Jack Boyle 
Bebe Neuwirth as Kelly Peterson 
Tony Terraciano as Jack Reagan 
Andrew Terraciano as Sean Regan 
Treat Williams as Lenny Ross

Special Guest Star

Whoopi Goldberg as Regina Thomas

Episodes

Ratings

References

External links

2017 American television seasons
2018 American television seasons
Blue Bloods (TV series)